Sowa may refer to:

Places
 Sowa, Botswana, a town in Botswana, Africa also known as the home of rorisang ranku
 SoWa, a district in Boston, Massachusetts, United States
 South Waterfront or SoWa, district in South Portland, Oregon, United States
 Sowa, Ibaraki, a town in Sashima District, Ibaraki, Japan.

Other
 Sowa (surname)
 Sowa language, extinct language of Vanuatu

See also